Mucilaginibacter rubeus is a bacterium from the genus of Mucilaginibacter which has been isolated from a gold and copper mine from Longyan in China.

References

External links
Type strain of Mucilaginibacter rubeus at BacDive -  the Bacterial Diversity Metadatabase

Sphingobacteriia
Bacteria described in 2017